Sheikh Mustafa Kamal is an Indian politician and one of the leaders of the Jammu & Kashmir National Conference Party in Jammu and Kashmir. He served in the state cabinets formed in 1983, 1987 and 1996.

Kamal is the son of Kashmiri leader Sheikh Abdullah, the brother of former Chief Minister of Jammu and Kashmir Farooq Abdullah and the uncle of the former Chief Minister Omar Abdullah.

References

Abdullah political family
State cabinet ministers of Jammu and Kashmir
Living people
Year of birth missing (living people)
Place of birth missing (living people)
Jammu & Kashmir National Conference politicians